Hard Rock Cafe, Inc. is an American multinational chain of theme bar-restaurants, memorabilia shops, casinos and museums founded in 1971 by Isaac Tigrett and Peter Morton in London. In 1979, the cafe began covering its walls with rock and roll memorabilia, a tradition which expanded to others in the chain. In 2007, Hard Rock Cafe International (USA), Inc. was sold to the Seminole Tribe of Florida and was headquartered in Orlando, Florida, until April 2018, when the corporate offices were relocated to Davie, Florida.  As of July 2018, Hard Rock International has venues in 74 countries, including 172 bar or cafe-restaurants, 37 hotels, and 4 casinos.

On June 10, 2021, Hard Rock announced Lionel Messi as its Hard Rock brand ambassador as the company celebrated its 50th anniversary.

History

Cafe-restaurants 

The first Hard Rock Cafe opened on June 14, 1971, at 150 Old Park Lane, Hyde Park, Mayfair, London, under the ownership of two Americans, Isaac Tigrett and Peter Morton. Hard Rock initially had an eclectic decor, but it later started to display memorabilia. In 1978, a second location was opened in Toronto, Canada.

The chain began to expand worldwide in 1982 with locations, among others, in Jackson, Tennessee,  Los Angeles, San Francisco, Chicago, Paris, and Berlin. Hard Rock Cafe locations in the United States vary from smaller, more tourist driven markets (Biloxi, Pigeon Forge, Key West) to large metropolises (Houston, Philadelphia, Baltimore, New York City, Chicago, Boston, Washington, D.C.).

Hard Rock Cafe typically does not franchise cafe locations in the United States. All U.S. cafes are corporate owned and operated, except for cafes in Tampa and in the Four Winds New Buffalo casino. However, in the transition of the Las Vegas Hard Rock Hotel property, originally owned and then later sold to Rank by founder Peter Morton, Morton retained hotel naming rights west of the Mississippi. When Morton sold his Las Vegas Hard Rock Hotel to the Morgans Hotel Group, he also sold those naming rights, which then gave rise to two US franchised hotels (without cafes) in Albuquerque and Tulsa. (The Albuquerque hotel no longer pays for the Hard Rock rights and reverted to its former name in June 2013.) Additional casino hotels franchised from Morgan's were subsequently opened in Sioux City, Iowa and Vancouver, Canada.
A Hard Rock Cafe exists in Empire, Colorado, which was established in 1934 that is not part of the chain.

In 1990, The Rank Group, a London-based leisure company, acquired Mecca Leisure Group and continued expansion of the concept in its geographic territory. Rank went on to purchase Hard Rock America from Peter Morton as well as Hard Rock Canada from Nick Bitove. After the completion of these acquisitions, Rank gained worldwide control of the brand. In March 2007, the Seminole Tribe of Florida acquired Hard Rock Cafe International, Inc. and other related entities from Rank for US$965 million.

In 2008, anonymous members of the wait staff in London criticized the business because of its practice of paying them less than half the official minimum wage in the UK, with the business allocating the tips to staff wages, thus bringing their salaries within the minimum wage requirements. Most customers, it was argued, do not realize that they are subsidizing a low wage when they give the tip.

Music memorabilia 

HRC is known for its collection of rock-and-roll memorabilia. The cafes solicit donations of music memorabilia but also purchase a number of items at auctions around the world, including autographed guitars, costumes from world tours and rare photographs; these are often to be found mounted on cafe walls. The collection began in 1979 with an un-signed Red Fender Lead II guitar from Eric Clapton, who was a regular at the first restaurant in London. Clapton wanted management to hang the guitar over his regular seat in order to lay claim to that spot, and they obliged. This prompted Pete Townshend of The Who to give one of his guitars, also un-signed with the note "Mine's as good as his! Love, Pete." Hard Rock's archive includes over 80,000 items, and is the largest private collection of Rock and Roll memorabilia in the world. Marquee pieces from the collection were briefly displayed in a Hard Rock museum named "The Vault" in Orlando, Florida from January 2003 until September 2004. After the closure, items were distributed to various restaurant locations. The London Vault remains open and free to visitors, located in the retail Rock Shop of the original cafe.

The Hard Rock Café is also in possession of a Bedford VAL three axle coach used in the 1967 Beatles film Magical Mystery Tour. The vehicle was completely refurbished after filming. It is currently displayed in the US, but makes regular appearances in events in the UK, especially at the original Hard Rock Cafe in London. In 2001, a competition was run to win the actual bus, but it was never given away and remained with the cafe.

Expansion into other businesses

Casinos and hotels 

In 1995, Peter Morton spent $80 million to open the Hard Rock Hotel near the Las Vegas Strip in Las Vegas, Nevada. A subsequent $100 million expansion in 1999 nearly doubled the hotel's capacity.

In May 2006, Morton sold the Hard Rock Hotel & Casino, Las Vegas to Morgans Hotel Group for $770 million, including the rights to the Hard Rock Hotel brand west of the Mississippi, including Texas, California, Australia, and Vancouver, British Columbia. The hotel began another expansion in 2007 at a cost of $750 million. The project added 875 rooms in two towers and expanded meeting space. In March 2011, Morgans surrendered control of the property to partner Brookfield Asset Management, citing the high debt on the property in the face of the economic downturn. In April 2018, the Hard Rock Hotel in Las Vegas was sold to Richard Branson with plans to renovate the property under the Virgin Hotels brand; Virgin Hotels Las Vegas debuted in March 2021.

Today, the Seminole Tribe of Florida owns and operates all units except the Sioux City, Tulsa, and Vancouver properties. In 2004, Hard Rock International and Sol Melia Hotels and Resorts launched Lifestar Hoteles España SL, a joint venture that intended to manage Europe's first Hard Rock Hotel in Madrid, but it was never opened as a Hard Rock property upon the dissolution of the joint venture in 2007. The other joint venture hotels are in Chicago, New York, and San Diego (the San Diego property includes Hard Rock condominiums). Hard Rock also operates hotels and resorts in Orlando, Florida (a joint venture with Loews Hotels); Bali, Indonesia; and Pattaya, Thailand, (a joint venture with Ong Beng Seng/Hotel Properties Limited). Hard Rock International continues to expand internationally (including hotels, casinos, resorts, and condominiums) through several joint ventures (Becker Ventures, Ong Beng Seng/Hotel Properties Limited and Loews Hotels), including hotels in Chicago, Bali, Orlando, Penang, San Diego, Singapore, and planned openings in Abu Dhabi, Cancun, Dubai, Hungary, Panama, Punta Cana and Puerto Vallarta, as well as hotel-casinos in Hollywood, Florida; Tampa, Florida; Las Vegas, Nevada; and Catoosa, Oklahoma, just northeast of Tulsa.
(The Hard Rock Casino in Biloxi, MS is owned by Twin River Management Group, Inc.) Opened on 20 January 2010 in Singapore at Sentosa, the Hard Rock Hotel at Resorts World Sentosa is owned by the Genting Group.

The Hotel Zoso in Palm Springs, California was converted into a 160-room Hard Rock Hotel and opened in 2014. A location in Atlantic City, New Jersey was planned in 2010, but those plans were canceled in 2012;  however, in 2017, they acquired from Icahn Enterprises the closed Trump Taj Mahal, which in 2018 was reopened as Hard Rock Hotel & Casino Atlantic City. All-inclusive resorts operate under the Hard Rock brand in the Dominican Republic and Mexico. In 2013, the Hard Rock Rocksino Northfield Park opened as a joint slot machine and track venture., near Cleveland, Ohio. Then in early 2019, it was announced that JACK Cincinnati Casino in Cincinnati was sold for $745 million to Vici Properties and Hard Rock International, with Vici acquiring the land and buildings for $558 million and Hard Rock buying the operating business for $187 million. Hard Rock would lease the casino from Vici for $43 million per year, and would rebrand it as Hard Rock Casino Cincinnati.

Canada had numerous restaurants but many of them closed, notably the one at Yonge-Dundas Square in Toronto in May 2017, which had been the chain's second location, leaving just two in that country, Niagara Falls, Ont., and the Hard Rock Casino in Coquitlam, B.C.

In 2015, Hard Rock announced a new hotel in Bogotá, Colombia, which will open in 2019. The company had plans to open in the biggest financial district in Colombia, the Centro Internacional, but it revised those plans. The hotel will be located in the exclusive Zona Rosa de Bogotá, home of luxury boutiques.

In July 2019, Hard Rock International announced plans for a casino in Rockford, Illinois, about 75 miles west of Chicago along I-90. Two other proposals were made for the city's lone casino license, but the city council only recommended the Hard Rock proposal to the Illinois Gaming Board, who will decide which site will get the license. The temporary casino, named Rockford Casino-A Hard Rock Opening Act, opened on November 10, 2021. It features a Rock Shop, Hard Rock memorabilia, slots, and two restaurants. The permanent casino is planned to open within two years and feature a Hard Rock Cafe, live music venue, 90 foot tall replica of a Rick Nielson guitar, and will be a full-fledge Hard Rock Casino.

In November 2019, Hard Rock Hotel & Casino Sacramento at Fire Mountain opened adjacent to the Toyota Amphitheatre near Wheatland, California. Also in November, Hard Rock announced a new hotel in São Paulo, Brazil, in the heart of popular Paulista Avenue.

In January 2021, it was announced that Hard Rock will be opening a new hotel in London, Ontario, Canada, with a 353-room hotel slated to finish construction in 2025. It will be located in the 100 Kellogg Lane complex.

In May 2021, a $300 million Hard Rock Casino location opened in Gary, Indiana about 35 minutes east of Chicago. Branded as Hard Rock Casino Northern Indiana, the location includes memorabilia from local natives Jackson 5 and a 1,950-seat Hard Rock Live performance hall.

In December 2021, Hard Rock purchased a casino on the Las Vegas Strip, The Mirage, from MGM Resorts for $1.075 billion. The deal closed in December 2022.  The property will be completely renovated, but is permitted to keep using "The Mirage" name for up to 3 years. A new 36-story hotel tower in the shape of a guitar, like the one at the Seminole Hard Rock, will be added.

Hard Rock Park 

In March 2006, Hard Rock Cafe International announced that it had licensed the "Hard Rock" name to HRP Myrtle Beach Operations, LLC, to design, build, and operate a $400 million  theme park called Hard Rock Park. Hard Rock Park opened on April 15, 2008, in Myrtle Beach, South Carolina. The park was expected to draw an estimated 30,000 visitors per day, promised to create more than 3,000 jobs, and was billed as the largest single investment in South Carolina's history. It planned to feature a large concert arena and six zones with more than 40 attractions. HRP Myrtle Beach Operations, LLC, filed for Chapter 11 on September 25, 2008. The company hoped to re-open in 2009 after restructuring. On January 2, 2009, after failing to attract a buyer with a minimum $35 million bid for over two months, Hard Rock Park asked a Delaware Bankruptcy Court to convert the filing to Chapter 7 triggering immediate liquidation of assets to pay off creditors, and closing the park.

New owners renamed the venue Freestyle Music Park and planned to reopen retaining a music-theme, but without the Hard Rock name, by Memorial Day, 2009. The park only operated one additional year and then closed, due to poor attendance.

Stadiums 

In August 2016, it was reported that the Miami Dolphins' stadium in Miami Gardens, Florida would be renamed Hard Rock Stadium. Super Bowl LIV was held there on February 2, 2020.

The Hard Rock Club is a sponsored bar at the Canadian Tire Centre, with Hard Rock branding and memorabilia. The stadium formerly housed Ottawa's first Hard Rock Café when it opened as The Palladium on January 15, 1996, and for many years when it was known as the Corel Centre. The café closed on August 8, 2002, and was replaced with the Frank Finnigan's restaurant. Since October 17, 2013, the restaurant is known as Chek Point, and is sponsored by SportChek. The Hard Rock Club bar was announced on October 9, 2018, and opened near the former Hard Rock Café. The bar features memorabilia from over a dozen artists, restaurant-style seating, and dedicated stadium seating.

Acquisition by the Seminole Tribe of Florida 

On December 7, 2006, Rank sold its Hard Rock business to the Seminole Tribe of Florida for $965 million. Included in the deal were 124 Hard Rock Cafes, four Hard Rock Hotels, two Hard Rock Hotel and Casino Hotels, two Hard Rock Live! concert venues, and stakes in three unbranded hotels. Rank retained the Hard Rock Casino in London, and rebranded it the G Casino Piccadilly. The Hard Rock Hotel and Casino in Las Vegas was also not part of the deal, as it was sold by Peter Morton to Morgans Hotel Group in May 2006. The final takeover was mired in controversy, due to a payment clause in a contract with one casino developer, Power Plant Entertainment. Power Plant and the Seminoles announced a settlement in April 2007 which both sides called equitable. On January 8, 2007, Rank shareholders approved the Seminoles' $965 million offer. The Tribe announced it had finalized the deal on March 11, 2007.

On June 22, 2008, the Seminole Hard Rock Hotel & Casino Hollywood began "Vegas-style" table gambling in addition to the Class II slots already in operation. To win approval for the table games, which were barred under Florida law, the Seminole Tribe paid the State of Florida $100 million as part of a 25-year pact signed by Governor Charlie Crist. On July 3, 2008, the Florida Supreme Court ruled that the governor's agreement was unconstitutional, but table games continue to operate because the Federal Department of the Interior approved the now-invalid pact with the state.

Controversy 

During the 2022 Russian invasion of Ukraine, Hard Rock Cafe refused to join the international community and withdraw from the Russian market. An April 28 study by Yale University, intended to identify how companies were reacting to the invasion, placed Hard Rock Cafe in the second-worst category of "Buying Time", meaning "Holding Off New Investments/Development: companies postponing future planned investment/development/marketing while continuing substantive business".

Gallery

See also 

 Bubba Gump Shrimp Company Restaurant and Market
 Fashion Cafe
 Morrison Hotel
 Planet Hollywood
 Rainforest Cafe
 Hard Rock Cafe (Empire, CO) - Not related to the franchise, this restaurant dates back to 1934 and is named for the hard rock miners that made up its early customers.

References

External links 

 
 Official Hard Rock Hotel and Casino Site
 Hard Rock Cafe News, arrakeen.ch
 Video review of the Hard Rock Cafe with on-site footage
 Video tour of the Hard Rock Hotel Singapore
 Hard Rock Memorabilia Gallery
 "Seattle welcomes Hard Rock Cafe"

 
Companies based in Davie, Florida
Restaurant chains in the United States
Restaurant franchises
Restaurants established in 1971
Seminole Tribe of Florida
Theme restaurants
Restaurant chains in the United Kingdom
1971 establishments in England
Restaurant chains in Singapore
Fast-food chains of Singapore
Restaurants in Singapore